Roy Elliot Corcoran (born May 11, 1980) is an American former professional baseball pitcher. He previously played in Major League Baseball from 2003 to 2009 for the Montreal Expos, Washington Nationals and Seattle Mariners. He threw and batted right-handed.

Professional career

Montreal Expos/Washington Nationals
Corcoran signed with the Montreal Expos on June 21, as an amateur free agent. After starting the  season at Single-A, Corcoran advanced through Double-A and made two appearances in Triple-A before making his major league debut on July 30. He spent the next three years in the minors with the Expos and stayed with them after they became the Washington Nationals.

Florida Marlins
Corcoran was granted free agency after 2006, and signed a minor league contract with the Florida Marlins on January 4, . Corcoran spent all of the 2007 season with the Marlins Triple-A affiliate, the Albuquerque Isotopes, becoming a free agent at the end of the season.

Seattle Mariners

On November 21, 2007, the Seattle Mariners signed Corcoran to a minor league contract and invited him to spring training. In 50 appearances, he had a 6–3 record, 3.22 ERA, and 39 strikeouts.

The Mariners designated Corcoran for assignment on July 24, . Corcoran was 2–0 with a 6.16 ERA in 16 games in 2009. He had a six-week stint on the disabled list with a strained neck.

Houston Astros
On August 5,  Corcoran signed a minor league contract with the Houston Astros that included an invitation to spring training. He  played for the Triple-A affiliate Round Rock Express.

He was granted free agency after the 2010 season.

Los Angeles Dodgers
He signed as a free agent with the Los Angeles Dodgers on July 4, 2011. He appeared in 2 games for the AA Chattanooga Lookouts and 19 games for the AAA Albuquerque Isotopes, finishing a combined 1–3 with a 6.81 ERA.

Personal life
During the offseason after the 2008 season, Corcoran married his wife Lacy, and they currently reside in Slaughter, Louisiana. His brother, Tim Corcoran, also played professional baseball.

References

External links

Bleeding Blue and Teal - Player Profile: Roy Corcoran
heraldnet.com

1980 births
Living people
Albuquerque Isotopes players
American expatriate baseball players in Canada
American expatriate baseball players in Mexico
Baseball players from Baton Rouge, Louisiana
Brevard County Manatees players
Cajun sportspeople
Chattanooga Lookouts players
Clinton LumberKings players
Edmonton Trappers players
Gulf Coast Expos players
Harrisburg Senators players
Jupiter Hammerheads players
Major League Baseball pitchers
Mexican League baseball pitchers
Montreal Expos players
Navegantes del Magallanes players
American expatriate baseball players in Venezuela
New Orleans Zephyrs players
People from East Feliciana Parish, Louisiana
Peoria Saguaros players
Rieleros de Aguascalientes players
Round Rock Express players
Seattle Mariners players
Sugar Land Skeeters players
Tacoma Rainiers players
Tigres del Licey players
American expatriate baseball players in the Dominican Republic
Washington Nationals players